Nob Island is the largest of the Anagram Islands, lying on the south side of French Passage in the Wilhelm Archipelago. So named by the United Kingdom Antarctic Place-Names Committee (UK-APC) in 1961 because there is a black knob of rock, almost permanently snow free, on the north side of the island which is a useful navigational mark for vessels using French Passage; nob is a spelling of knob.

See also 
 List of Antarctic and sub-Antarctic islands

Islands of the Wilhelm Archipelago